Manganese(II) iodide is the chemical compound composed of manganese and iodide with the formula MnI2. The anhydrous compound adopts the cadmium iodide crystal structure. The pink tetrahydrate is known. Unlike MnX2(H2O)4, which are cis for X = Cl, Br, the iodides are trans in MnI2(H2O)4.

It can be used as a pink pigment or as a source of the manganese ion or iodide ion. It is often used in the lighting industry.

References

Manganese(II) compounds
Iodides
Metal halides